Terje Høilund  is a Norwegian handball player.

He made his debut on the Norwegian national team in 1965, 
and played 11 matches for the national team between 1965 and 1967. He participated at the 1967 World Men's Handball Championship.

References

Year of birth missing (living people)
Living people
Norwegian male handball players